Emesiini is a tribe of metalmark butterflies in the family Riodinidae. There are at least 2 genera and about 15 described species in Emesiini.

Genera
These two genera belong to the tribe Emesiini:
 Apodemia C. & R. Felder, [1865]
 Emesis Fabricius, 1807

References

 Pelham, Jonathan P. (2008). "A catalogue of the butterflies of the United States and Canada with a complete bibliography of the descriptive and systematic literature". Journal of Research on the Lepidoptera, vol. 40, xiv + 658.

Further reading

External links

 

Riodininae